Anna Santamans (born 25 April 1993) is a French swimmer. She competed at the 2012 Summer Olympics in London.

References

1993 births
Living people
People from Arles
French female butterfly swimmers
French female freestyle swimmers
Olympic swimmers of France
Swimmers at the 2012 Summer Olympics
Swimmers at the 2016 Summer Olympics
Swimmers at the 2010 Summer Youth Olympics
Mediterranean Games gold medalists for France
Mediterranean Games silver medalists for France
Mediterranean Games bronze medalists for France
Swimmers at the 2013 Mediterranean Games
Sportspeople from Bouches-du-Rhône
Mediterranean Games medalists in swimming
Universiade silver medalists for France
Universiade medalists in swimming
Youth Olympic gold medalists for France
Medalists at the 2013 Summer Universiade
20th-century French women
21st-century French women
Swimmers at the 2022 Mediterranean Games